H. Lawrence Hinkley (May 16, 1896 – June 2, 1962) was an American politician who served as the Attorney General of Colorado from 1945 to 1949.

References

1896 births
1962 deaths
Colorado Attorneys General
Colorado Republicans